Lohvynove is a village in Horlivka Raion (district) in Donetsk Oblast of eastern Ukraine, at 58.6 km NE from the centre of Donetsk city, at about 4 km NW from Debaltseve.

The settlement was taken under control of pro-Russian forces during the War in Donbass, that started in 2014. The conflict has brought both civilian and military casualties.

Demographics
The settlement had 57 inhabitants in 2001. Native language distribution as of the Ukrainian Census of 2001:
Ukrainian: 71.93%
Russian: 28.07%

References

Villages in Horlivka Raion